Hoodia ruschii is a species of stem succulent plant in the family Apocynaceae. It is endemic to Namibia.  Its natural habitats are rocky areas and cold desert.

Description
Hoodia ruschii reaches about 1/2 meter in height and has stout, grayish green stems covered in sharp, hard spines. It bears deep reddish-brown flowers which are medium-sized.

References

Endemic flora of Namibia
ruschii
Least concern plants
Taxonomy articles created by Polbot
Taxa named by Kurt Dinter